Mikhail Fedorovich Skorodumov was a Russian general who participated in World War I, the White movement, and founded the Nazi-allied Russian Corps in Serbia during World War II.

Skorodumov was born in 1892. He graduated the 1st Cadet Corps and the Pavlovsk Military Academy in 1912, as a sub-lieutenant of the Pavlovsk detachment. In 1914 with his detachment he was sent to the front. He was awarded the St. Vladimir order for bravery in battle, during which he was heavily wounded and consequently placed off duty. Skorodumov lobbied strongly to return to the front, and in 1915 was taken prisoner by the Germans. He unsuccessfully tried to escape three times, and after seven months of imprisonment returned to St. Petersburg in a prisoner exchange agreement (thanks partly to the lobbying of Grand Duchess Maria Pavlovna). He was awarded the Cross of St. George for bravery.

In the wake of the October Revolution Skorodumov joined an underground anti-Bolshevik officer's organization. Upon its discovery by the Reds, he fled to join the Volunteer Army in the south of Russia. He served in the army as an invalid wearing a prosthesis, and was additionally wounded in the leg during the siege of Kiev in 1919. After being interred in Poland he left for the army of General Pyotr Wrangel in the Crimea.

After Wrangel's defeat, Skorodumov evacuated with the army to Gallipoli, after which he moved to Bulgaria. As a commandant in the city of Lovech, he left with General Alexander Kutepov to the Kingdom of Yugoslavia. There in Yugoslavia, Skorodumov built a memorial for the fallen Russian veterans of World War I.

In 1941, Skorodumov offered the German occupying forces in Yugoslavia to form the Russian Corps, an independent armed outfit of Russian white emigres with the purpose of defending the local Russian populace and factories from the communist guerillas who were fighting against the genocide being carried out by the Nazi aligned puppet government. Skorodumov hoped that the Germans would agree to deploy the Corps on the Eastern front, where it would become the centre of a Russian anti-communist liberation movement. The German forces agreed to work with Skorodumov and appointed him as the head of the Russian Corps, only to be arrested by the Gestapo three days later for proclaiming the corps as an "independent" armed force. Skorodumov passed on command to Boris Shteifon, whom the Germans approved of.

After leaving jail, Skorodumov demonstratively refused to join the Corps and worked for three years as a cobbler. In 1944, Skorodumov decided to enlist in the Corps as a private, then went to Austria to save his family from the advancing communist armies. He moved to the United States and pleaded with the "Humanity Calls" organization to help the veterans of the Corps receive displaced person status, thus enabling them to seek refuge in the United States.

Skorodumov died in Los Angeles on November 15, 1963, and was buried in the Hollywood Forever Cemetery.

1892 births
1963 deaths
Russian generals
White Russian emigrants to the United States
Russian collaborators with Nazi Germany
Russian military personnel of World War I
Russian Corps personnel
White movement generals
Russian anti-communists
White Russian emigrants to Bulgaria
Emigrants from the Russian Empire to Bulgaria